The 2004–05 season was Ulster Rugby's tenth under professionalism, and their first under head coach Mark McCall. They competed in the Heineken Cup, the Celtic League and the Celtic Cup.

Former head coach Alan Solomons and forwards coach Adrian Kennedy left at the end of the previous season to join Northampton Saints. Backs coach Mark McCall was named as the new head coach, with Allen Clarke as his assistant. Maurice Field replaced Clarke as head of the academy.

In the Celtic League, they finished eighth. Tommy Bowe was the league's second top try scorer with eight. In the Heineken Cup, they finished third in Pool 6, failing to qualify for the knockout stage. They went out of the Celtic Cup in the quarter-finals, losing to Neath-Swansea Ospreys. Neil Best was Ulster's Player of the Year. Kieran Campbell won the IRUPA award for Try of the Year.

Squad

Senior squad

Players in
  Andrew Kershaw from Saracens (loaned to Leeds Tykes in February 2005)
  Campbell Feather from Border Reivers
  Kevin Maggs from Bath
  Gavin Pfister from Pertemps Bees

Players out
  Clem Boyd (retired)
  Robbi Kempson to Northampton
  Matt Sexton (retired)
  Warren Brosnihan (released)
  Tony McWhirter (retired)
  Ryan Constable (retired)

Academy squad

2004–05 Heineken Cup

Pool 6

2004-05 Celtic League

Celtic Cup

Quarter-final

Ulster Rugby Awards

The Ulster Rugby Awrds ceremony was held at the Ramada Hotel on 12 May 2005. Winners were:

Bank of Ireland Ulster Player of the Year: Neil Best
Guinness Ulster Rugby Personality of the Year: Tommy Bowe
Club Ulster Supporters Player of the Year: Kieran Campbell
Kukri Schools Player of the Year: David Pollock, Royal School Dungannon
First Trust Bank Club of the Year: Ballymena RFC
Calor Gas Youth Player of the Year: Nigel Newell, Ballynahinch RFC
Dorrington B. Faulkner Award: Brian Reid, Coleraine RFC
Northern Bank Coach of the Year: Gerald McCarter, City of Derry R.F.C., Ulster U21s
Downtown Radio Club/PRO Media Liaison Officer of the Year: Joan Beatty, Enniskillen
Belfast Telegraph Club Team of the Year: Ballymena RFC 2nd XV
The Botanic Inns Merit Award: Suzanne Flemming

References

2004-05
Ulster
Ulster
Ulster